Tres (Three) is the seventh studio album by Salvadoran singer Álvaro Torres, released on 1985 through Fonovisa Records. It was produced by produced by Enrique Elizondo and it was recorded in George Tobin Studios, North Hollywood, CA.

The album was a success in Latin America and was his first album to chart in the United States, peaking at number 4 in May 1986, on the Billboard Latin Pop Albums chart. The single "Mi Amor Por Ti" interpreted along with Mexican singer Marisela, became the biggest hit from this album. Also "De Punta a Punta" and "Tres" obtained a huge recognition all across Latin America and United States.

Track listing

Personnel 
Credits adapted from Tres liner notes.

Vocals

 Álvaro Torres – lead vocals
 Marisela – lead vocals

Musicians

 David White – arrangements

Production

 Enrique Elizondo – production
 Alan Hirshberg  – engineering

Recording

 Recorded at George Tobin Studios, North Hollywood, CA

Charts

Weekly charts

Year-end charts

References 

1985 albums
Álvaro Torres albums